is a Japanese manga artist. He is best known as the creator of the manga series Ichi the Killer, which was adapted into a live-action film by Takashi Miike in 2001, and Homunculus.

Recurring themes in his manga are crime, sexual deviations, and the human mind.

Biography
Hideo Yamamoto received the "Tetsuya Chiba Award", given to promising young manga creators in 1988. After resigning from the post of assistant of a popular seinen manga artist, Kenshi Hirokane, he made his professional debut by drawing SHEEP (written by Masahiko Takasho) for Weekly Young Sunday in 1989.

Works
 Sheep, 1989
 Okama Report, 1989–1991 
 Voyeur (Nozokiya), 1992
 Another One Bites The Dust (illustrated by Koshiba Tetsuya)
 Voyeurs, Inc. (Shin Nozokiya), 1993–1997
 Ichi the Killer, 1998–2001
 Homunculus, 2003–2011
 Yume Onna, 2013 (illustrated by Hiroya Oku)
 Hikari-Man, 2014–2020
 Adam and Eve, 2015–2016 (illustrated by Ryoichi Ikegami)

References

External links
 Hideo Yamamoto in Media Arts Database 
 

1968 births
Living people
Manga artists from Saitama Prefecture
People from Tokorozawa, Saitama